or  , in the Bible, is a city in the Tribe of Asher from which the Canaanites were not driven out, identified with the Aphaca of classical times, the modern Afka, or alternatively with Tel Afek near Haifa. "And Asher did not dispossess the ones living in Accho, and the ones living in Sidon, and Ahlab, and Achzib, and Helbah, and Aphik, and Rehob".

Hebrew Bible cities